28 is a 2014 Sri Lankan feature drama film directed and produced by Prasanna Jayakody. The film starred by Mahendra Perera and Semini Iddamalgoda in lead roles along with Rukmal Nirosh, Sarath Kothalawala. 28 revolves how three men transport the body of a woman, who was raped and murdered, in an old van. One of the men will find out that the woman is his estranged wife. The film name is given considering that the average menstrual cycle of a woman is around 28 Days. (Which is also equal for the moon to complete one full orbit around earth).

The film premiered at the International Film Festival Rotterdam on January 24, 2014, and was released officially in Sri Lanka on 2 June 2017 in CEL Theatres. It is the 1279th Sri Lankan film in the Sinhala cinema.

Plot
In a country where sexuality has become a vulgarity, a man sees his wife nude for the first time as she lay dead after she was sexually assaulted on a mortuary table and then struggles emotionally, to at least claim as his own, the merest part of her body.

Lenin is livid that he has been tricked into transporting a dead body but, seeing the dead Suddhi's torso he agrees unconditionally to transport her body back to the village. When the coffin arrives, the villagers already know how Suddhi died through newspaper reports and rumors resulting in Abasiri's humiliation in front of them.

Suddhi addresses the mourners at her own funeral stating that she is now bereft of fear and censure since she is dead and provides telling and powerful testimony on behalf of all women.

Cast
 Mahendra Perera as Abasiri
 Rukmal Nirosh as Mani
 Semini Iddamalgoda as Suddi
 Sarath Kothalawala as Lenin
 Daya Thennakoon as Ukku Banda
 Sisira Kadikara
 Nilmini Kottegoda
 Priyantha Prabath
 Ariyaratne Perera

Awards
The film was screened at the Rotterdam International Film Festival in the Netherlands. It won the NETPAC Jury Award for Best Film. Mahendra Perera and Prasanna Jayakody nominated for two Asia Pacific Screen Awards for Best Performance by an Actor and Best Screenplay respectively.

Reception
28 was met by mostly positive reviews. Jury of the Rotterdam International Film Festival mentioned that “a well-measured and crafted film that emotionally engages the audience through poetic storytelling of a critical subject.”

References

External links

2010s Sinhala-language films
2014 films
Films set in Sri Lanka (1948–present)
2014 drama films
Sri Lankan drama films